Admiral Scott may refer to:

Albert Charles Scott (1872–1969), was a British Royal Navy vice admiral
Brent W. Scott (fl. 1970s–2020s), U.S. Navy rear admiral
Lord Charles Montagu Douglas Scott (1839–1911), British Royal Navy admiral
David Scott (Royal Navy officer) (1921–2006), British Royal Navy rear admiral
Gustavus H. Scott (1812–1882), United States Navy rear admiral
James Scott (Royal Navy officer) (1790–1872), British Royal Navy admiral
John Addison Scott (1906–1986), U.S. Navy rear admiral
Norman Scott (admiral) (1889–1942), U.S. Navy rear admiral
Percy Scott (1853–1924), British Royal Navy admiral

See also
Alan Scott-Moncrieff (1900–1980), Royal Navy admiral